Elections to Manchester City Council took place on  3 May 2012, on the same day as other 2012 United Kingdom local elections. One third of the council was up for election, with those councillors elected in the 2008 Manchester Council election having defended their seats on this occasion with vote share changes compared on that basis.

The composition of the Council after the election was as follows:

Election result

Ward results

Asterisks denote incumbent Councillors seeking re-election.

Ancoats and Clayton

Ardwick

Baguley

Bradford

Brooklands

Burnage

Charlestown

Cheetham

Chorlton

Chorlton Park

City Centre

Crumpsall

Didsbury East

Didsbury West

Fallowfield

Gorton North

Gorton South

Harpurhey

Higher Blackley

Hulme

Levenshulme

Longsight

Miles Platting and Newton Heath

Moss Side

Moston

Northenden

Old Moat

Rusholme

Sharston

Whalley Range

Withington

Woodhouse Park

By-elections between 2012 and 2013

Ardwick: 15 November 2012

Ancoats and Clayton: 10 October 2013

Ancoats and Clayton: 5 December 2013

References 

Manchester
2012
2010s in Manchester